LOS, or Los, or LoS may refer to:

Science and technology
 Length of stay, the duration of a single episode of hospitalisation
 Level of service, a measure used by traffic engineers
 Level of significance, a measure of statistical significance 
 Line-of-sight (disambiguation)
 LineageOS, a free and open-source operating system for smartphones and tablet computers 
 Loss of signal
 Fading
End of pass (spaceflight)
 Loss of significance, undesirable effect in calculations using floating-point arithmetic

Medicine and biology
 Lipooligosaccharide, a bacterial lipopolysaccharide with a low-molecular-weight
 Lower oesophageal sphincter

Arts and entertainment 
 The Land of Stories, a series of children's novels by Chris Colfer
 Los, or the Crimson King, a character in Stephen King's novels
 Los (band), a British indie rock band from 2008 to 2011
 Los (Blake), a character in William Blake's poetry
 Los (rapper) (born 1982), stage name of American rapper Carlos Coleman
 "Los", a song from the Rammstein album Reise, Reise
Los, or 'Legion of Skanks', is a comedy podcast on Gas Digital Network.

Games and sports 
 Line of scrimmage, in American football
 Lucas Oil Stadium, Indianapolis, Indiana, the home of the Indianapolis Colts football team

Locations 
 Îles de Los, Guinea
 Los, Sweden
 Łoś, Masovian Voivodeship, Poland
 Los, a small crater on Mars

Business 
 LOS AS, a Norwegian electricity supplier and subsidiary of Agder Energi
 Loan Origination System

Weapons
 PZL.37 Łoś, Polish bomber aircraft
 Los (Лось), Soviet hunting rifle

Other uses 
Los (surname)
 Law of the sea
 London Oratory School, a Catholic secondary school in Fulham, London; commonly known as The Oratory
 League of the South, a neo-Confederate group
 los, ISO 639 code for the Loniu language of Papua New Guinea
 los, a determiner in the Spanish language
 los, a pronoun in the Spanish language
 LOS, the IATA code for Murtala Muhammed International Airport in Lagos, Nigeria
 LOS, the National Rail code for Lostwithiel railway station in Cornwall, UK

See also
 
 Loos (disambiguation)
 Lost (disambiguation)
 LDOS (disambiguation)